Robert McKinley may refer to:

 Robert McKinley (politician) (born 1928), Canadian politician
 Robert McKinley (cricketer) (born 1993), cricketer from Northern Ireland
 Robert McKinley (tennis), American tennis player